The Hellfreaks are a Hungarian punk rock band from Budapest, formed in 2009. Originally a psychobilly band, the band switched to punk rock on their third album Astoria.

History 
The Hellfreaks were formed in February 2009. However, the band's history began back in 2007 when the two founders played in a surf psycho band called Los Tiki Torpedoes. Freaky Tiki was a guitarist and Shakey Sue was a drummer. After many performances together, the two decided in 2009 that they wanted to take a harder musical stance. This is how The Hellfreaks were formed, who stylistically locate themselves between psychobilly, horror punk and metal.

In 2010, they released their first album entitled Hell, Sweet Hell. Theeir second album, Circus of Shame, was released in the summer of 2012, which was pressed on red vinyl in a limited edition in addition to the CD.

After the band hadn't been heard from for a long time, Shakey Sue announced in early 2015 that the band was back with a new line-up and that they would be touring in the US and Europe in 2015 and 2016. The double bass was replaced by an electric bass.

The Hellfreaks released their third studio album Astoria in 2016, with which the band says it represents a change in style from psychobilly/horrorpunk to female fronted modern punk-rock-riot! was completed. The style on Astoria is reminiscent of the early sound of the band The Distillers.

Members

Current members 
 Shakey Sue (Zsuzsa Radnóti) - vocals (since 2009)
 Korben Dallas (Gábor Domján) - bass (since 2015)
 Tomi Banhegyi (József Takács) - guitar (since 2015)
 Adam Szumper (Béla Budai) - drums (since 2015)

Former members 
 Freaky Tiki - guitar (2009-2014)
 Kevin Crime - double bass (2009-2014)
 Sick Rick - drums (2009-2014)

Discography

Studio albums 
 2010: Hell, Sweet Hell
 2012: Circus of Shame
 2016: Astoria
 2020: God on the Run

Compilations 
 2011: Psychomania Magazine, 
 2011: Big Five Magazine #6
 2012: Gothic Compilation Part LVI, 
 2012: We Are Rockers: Godless Wicked Creeps Tribute Album, Longneck Records
 2013: Dynamite Vol. 35 (supplement to the Dynamite magazine Vol. 80, 1/2013)
 2013: Roots! Riot! Rumble!, Wolverine Records
 2013: Punkabilly Shakes The World Vol. 2, Rude Runner Records
 2014: Punkabilly Shakes The World Vol.3, Rude Runner Records
 2014: Don't Mess With The Girls, Wolverine Records
 2017: Saving Souls With Rock'n Roll, Wolverine Records

Music videos 
 2011: Boogieman
 2013: Godless Girl's Fun
 2016: Rope 
 2017: Burn The Horizon
 2017: I'm Away

References

External links 

Hungarian punk rock groups
Horror punk groups
Psychobilly groups
Musical groups established in 2009
2009 establishments in Hungary
Napalm Records artists
Female-fronted musical groups
Musical quartets